The Face Behind The Mask is a 1977 Taiwanese wuxia film directed by Chen Chi-hwa.

Plot
Chi Tien-wei has been elected Chief of the jianghu after his three disciples eliminate the most feared fighters in the jianghu, namely: the "Militant Dragon and Tiger", the "Devil Stars" and the "Three Horrid Mice". However, not everyone is pleased at Wei's appointment as Chief and many anonymous fighters and wizards are sent to upset his household, "The First family". Soon Chi Tien-wei realizes that there is a betrayer within his own house.

Cast
Hsu Feng as Chi Mu-tan
Yueh Hua as Hsiao Meng-fei
Lo Lieh as Leng Yen-ching
Ma Yue-lung as Third Brother
Woo Kei as Chi Tien-wei
Go Ming as Tung Ling-hu
Chui Git as maid
Miao Tien as Yu
Sit Hon as Lei
Lee Man-tai as Szu-tu Ming
Lam Chiu-hung as Chen Hiu
Siu Yiu as Fifth Brother
Au Lap-bo as waiter
Wu Jiaxiang as General Lung
O Yau-man as Szu-tu Ming's brother
Chan Sam-lam as Blood Evil Star
Ho Wai-hung as Malignant Star in red
Hoh Gong as Sung Tao
Miu Tak-san as I Tiao
Ching Kuo-chung as Tsao Tung
Sun Jung-chi as thug
Woo Wai as Elder Mice
Man Man as guest
Hau Pak-wai as Szu-tu Ming's fighter
Sit Cheung-man
Cheung Chung-kwai
Cheung Yee-kwai

External links

1977 films
Taiwanese martial arts films
Wuxia films
Films directed by Chen Chi-hwa